Desmella rostellata is a species of tephritid or fruit flies in the genus Desmella of the family Tephritidae.

Distribution
Morocco.

References

Tephritinae
Insects described in 1941
Diptera of Africa